The 2022–23 Liga Primera de Nicaragua season was to be divided into two tournaments, Apertura and Clausura. The season will determine the 79th and 80th champions in the history of the Liga Primera de Nicaragua, the top division of football in Nicaragua. The Apertura tournament is to be played in the second half of 2022, while the Clausura is to be played in the first half of 2023.

Teams

Team information 

A total of ten teams contested the league, including nine sides from the 2021–22 Primera División, and one side from the 2021–22 Segunda División.

Real Madriz finished last in the aggregate table and were relegated to the Segunda División. The champions from the Segunda División, Matagalpa FC, were promoted in their place.

The 9th place team in the aggregate table, ART Jalapa, faced the second-place team from the Segunda División, CD Junior, in a playoff for a spot in the Primera División. ART Jalapa won 4–3 over two legs, meaning ART Jalapa remained in the Primera División.

Promotion and relegation 

Promoted from Segunda División  as of June, 2022.

 Champions:  Matagalpa FC

Relegated to Segunda División  as of June, 2022.

 Last Place: Real Madriz

Stadiums and locations

Personnel and kits

News

Shirt Sponsorship
Keuka agreed to sponsor 8 teams in the Liga Primera (2 teams not being sponsored is Diriangén and UNAN Managua) starting in the Clausura 2023.

Managerial Changes

Pre Season Apertura 2022

During the Apertura season

Pre-Season Clausura 2023

Apertura 2022

Finals

Quarterfinals 

Managua progressed.

Walter Ferretti progressed.

Semi-finals 

2-2 on aggregate, Walter Ferretti won 5-3 on penalties.

Real Estelí won 2-0 on aggregate.

Final

First leg

Second leg

4-4 on Aggregate. Real Esteli won 4-3 on penalties

Clausura 2023

List of foreign players in the league 
This is a list of foreign players in the 2022–23 season. The following players:

 Have played at least one game for the respective club.
 Have not been capped for the Nicaragua national football team on any level, independently from the birthplace

A new rule was introduced this season, that clubs can have four foreign players per club and can only add a new player if there is an injury or a player/s is released, and it is before the closing of the season transfer window.

ART Jalapa
  Jafet del Portillo
  Allan Medina 
  Bernando Laureiro *
  Juan Murillo
  Andrés Cortobarria 
  Denier Bonilla 
  Alfredo Oscar Rosales 
  Josué Lozano 
  Maykel Reyes

Diriangén
  Robinson Luiz 
  Jhon Mosquera *
  Taufic Guarch 
  Jonathan Pacheco
  Ramiro Peters 
  Carlos Tórres
  Patrick Torelli

Juventus Managua
  Lucas Dos Santos 
  Rafael Vieira (*)
  David Castrillón (*)
  Bernardo Gradilla (*)

CS Sebaco
  Miguel Pucharella (*)
  Franco Rondina
  Brayan Zúñiga (*)
  Miguel Soza (*)
  Miguel Morales

Managua
  Juan Sebastián Arce 
  Diego Areco 
  Ángel Velásquez (*)
  Kevin Castro (*)
  Carlo Vasquez 
  Robinson Luiz
  Lucas Dos Santos
  Taufic Guarch
  Brian Calabrese

Matagalpa FC
   Willian Morales
  Sebastián Barquero
  Bryan Marín 
  Rafael de Almeida
  Rogelio Robinson

Ocotal
  Juan Castaño 
  Juan Marín 
  Jean Rentería 
  Kenverlen López
  New Mena
  Dandy Choles
  Yubeiquer Arenas
  Gabriel Ortiz
  Carlos Daniel Duran
  Edwin Castro
  Allan Medina
  Ricardo Medina 

Real Estelí
  Fabián Monserrat
  Vinicius da Souza
  Ewerton da Silva 
  Douglas Caé
  José Ortiz Castillo 
  Alex Chandler 
  Pablo Gállego 
  Juan Manuel Trejo 
  Sidney Pages

UNAM Managua
  Jerson Lora  (*)
  Sebastian Alzáte 
  Joseph Donkor 
  Robinson Luiz 
  Lucas Dos Santos 
  Pedro Dos Santos
  Eugenio Palmero

Walter Ferretti
  Luciano Sanhueza (*)
  Ariel Torregrosa (*)
  Yeison Mosquera (*)
  Cesar Vente Contención *
  Maykel Reyes 

 (player released during the Apertura season)
 (player released between the Apertura and Clausura seasons)
 (player released during the Clausura season)

External links
Fútbol de Primera – Futbol Nica

Nicaraguan Primera División seasons
Nicaragua